Jacqueline Rose Driscoll Toboni (born February 18, 1992) is an American actress, known for her role as Theresa Rubel "Trubel" in Grimm (2014-2017).

Early life and education
Toboni is the youngest of five children. Her sister Gianna Toboni is a correspondent and producer with Vice Media.

She graduated from St. Ignatius College Preparatory in San Francisco in 2010 and from the University of Michigan in 2014. In addition, she studied at many theatre programs including the Williamstown Theatre Festival as an apprentice, the Movement Theatre Studio in New York, and the Royal Academy of Dramatic Art in London. Her father is of Italian descent. Her mother is of Irish ancestry.

Career
Toboni is known for her recurring role of Trubel in the NBC drama Grimm from 2014 to 2017.

In 2015, she appeared on one episode of Major Crimes.

Beginning in 2016, she also appeared in five episodes of the Netflix anthology series Easy.

In 2017, she appeared in the sixteenth season of Hell's Kitchen as a guest for episode eleven's dinner service that honored the contributors from Stand Up to Cancer.

In 2019, it was announced that she will star in The L Word: Generation Q, a sequel of the hit series The L Word. Her lesbian character Sarah Finley is an executive assistant who works for Alice.

Personal life 
On August 18, 2021, Toboni announced her engagement to Australian actress Kassandra Clementi. However, as of August 7, 2022, Kassandra confirmed via an Instagram comment that she and Jacqueline had "separated awhile ago, amicably".

Filmography

References

External links
 
 
 

1992 births
Actresses from San Francisco
American television actresses
American people of Italian descent
Living people
St. Ignatius College Prep alumni
University of Michigan alumni
LGBT actresses
LGBT people from California
21st-century American women